Aloisia is a given name. Notable people with the name include:

Aloisia (wrestler) (born 1987), American actress and wrestler
Aloisia Bauer (born 1951), German swimmer
Aloisia Brial (died 1972), Uvean queen
Aloisia Kirschner (1854–1934), Austrian novelist

See also
Aloysia (disambiguation)
Aloisea Inyumba